Vista Land & Lifescapes Inc. also known as simply Vista Land, is a property developer in the Philippines engaged in the real estate and retail industries. The company is part of the Villar Group of Companies associated with Manny Villar, along with the Starmalls, Inc. and Golden Haven, Inc.

History
Vista Land was incorporated on February 28, 2007 as a holding company of the Vista Group, which is involved in the real estate industry as a developer of residential subdivisions and condominiums.

Organization
Vista Land's operations is divided into four segments: horizontal, vertical, commercial, and affordable housing. The first two involves the development and sale of residential properties, the third deals with the company's venture in the retail and business process outsourcing industry, and the last is involved with the development and management of other business including resorts, hotels, club, and spas as well as activities of its holding companies. Vista Land has six subsidiaries namely Brittany Corporation, Crown Asia Properties, Vista Residences, Camella, Camella Manors, Lessandra, Communities Philippines, and VLL International Inc.

In 2020, Vista Land created Lumina Homes as line of mass housing communities.

Vista Land also operates the Vista Malls shopping mall chain.

References

2007 establishments in the Philippines
Conglomerate companies of the Philippines
Holding companies of the Philippines
Real estate companies of the Philippines
Companies listed on the Philippine Stock Exchange
Companies based in Mandaluyong